Angelique  Bates (born December 1, 1980) is an American actress, comedian, and rapper who is best known for the two seasons she served on the Nickelodeon sketch-comedy series All That.

Career

Early career
Bates was born and raised in Los Angeles, California, and is of Haitian and Native American descent. Bates got her start in a Borax commercial when she was a baby. She subsequently landed an AT&T commercial and a co-starring role in the short film Sweet Potato Ride.

All That

In 1994, Bates' agent sent her out to audition for All That and they liked what she did. She did a Steve Urkel impression among other things. Following four or five auditions, Bates got the part.

Bates left All That after two seasons; she was the first original cast member to leave the series. She did however return for the 100th episode, along with fellow All That alumnae Katrina Johnson and Alisa Reyes.

Filmography

References

External links

[https://www.angeliquebates.com/ 

1980 births
Actresses from Los Angeles
Actresses of Haitian descent
American people who self-identify as being of Native American descent
Living people
American television actresses
American child actresses
Rappers from Los Angeles
21st-century American rappers
21st-century American comedians
20th-century American rappers
African-American women rappers
Comedians from Los Angeles County
20th-century American actresses
21st-century American actresses
20th-century African-American women
20th-century African-American people
20th-century African-American musicians
21st-century African-American women
21st-century African-American musicians
20th-century women rappers
21st-century women rappers]